Kolbotek is a veteran Israeli consumer affairs and investigative reporting TV show on Channel 2. It premiered in December 1974 on Channel 1 and was then presented by Daniel Pe'er. Since 1979 the show has been presented by its editor and producer, Rafi Ginat.

References

1970s Israeli television series
1974 Israeli television series debuts
2014 Israeli television series endings
Channel 2 (Israeli TV channel) original programming
Channel 10 (Israeli TV channel) original programming
Israeli television news shows
Channel 1 (Israel) original programming